The Cedars, on Grayson Springs Road in Grayson County, Kentucky east of Leitchfield, was built in c.1789 and 1847.  It was listed on the National Register of Historic Places in 1976.

The main block of the brick house, Greek Revival in style, was built by Benjamin Lone Rogers in 1847.

It has also been known as the Benjamin Lone Rogers House.

See also
The Cedars (Franklin, Kentucky), in Simpson County, also NRHP-listed

References

National Register of Historic Places in Grayson County, Kentucky
Greek Revival architecture in Kentucky
Houses completed in 1789
1789 establishments in Virginia
Houses on the National Register of Historic Places in Kentucky
Pre-statehood history of Kentucky